Samuel Atherton (January 26, 1815 – April 3, 1895) was a Massachusetts businessman who served as a member of the Massachusetts House of Representatives.

Early life
He was born on January 26, 1815, the son of Samuel Atherton (1784-1877)  and Abigail Pope (1786-1868). His mother was the granddaughter of Colonel Ralph Pope, aide-de-camp to Gen. George Washington. His father was a farmer and a prominent citizen of Stoughton, Massachusetts.

He was an active member of the Stoughton Musical Society.  His grandfather John Atherton had been a founding member and had hosted many musical events for the Society at his home. His grandmother was Mary Adams, the daughter of Jedidiah Adams, a relative of Samuel Adams.

Career
He began as a clerk in a shoe store. Four years later her was employed by Caleb Stetson. He greatly improved the financial standing of the family, establishing himself as a retail dealer in boots and shoes, after entering into partnership with Stetson.

By 1852 "Atherton, Stetson and Company", dealers in leather, were one of Boston's most successful business at the time. His two younger brothers, James Atherton (1819-1879) and William, became his partners that same year.

Other business interests
He was a director of the New England Bank, Prescott Insurance Company, Massachusetts Loan and Trust Company, President of the Dorchester Gas-Light Company, Director of the Central Massachusetts Railroad, as well as being connected with many other corporations.

Political interest
He was a member of the Massachusetts State Legislature in  1867,  1870 and 1877, representing Dorchester.

Personal
Atherton was widowed twice. His first wife was Temperance “Tempie” Holbrook (1820–1849) and they had four children. Temperance died of consumption at the age of 29 when her youngest daughter, Sarah was just five months old.

He subsequently married Susan Baker (1833–1858).  She died two years later after giving birth to a child, named Susan, following the birth of Helen Louise “Nellie”.

He married his last wife on 1869; Susan M Bassett (1831–1907).

In 1890, Atherton was recorded as living in 121 Washington St, Boston.

Family
He was the uncle of the celebrated US Composer, Percy Lee Atherton; politician, Frederick Atherton; and the architect, Walter Atherton.

He was grandfather to the US diplomat, Ray Atherton.

Interest in genealogy
He was elected to the New England Historic Genealogical Society in 1870.

Atherton is a direct descendant of Major General Humphrey Atherton.

Death
He died on April 3, 1895. He was buried at Mount Auburn Cemetery in Cambridge, Massachusetts.

See also
 1877 Massachusetts legislature

References

Further reading
  

1815 births
1895 deaths
Massachusetts Republicans
Massachusetts Whigs
19th-century American politicians
People from Stoughton, Massachusetts
Businesspeople from Massachusetts
Members of the Massachusetts House of Representatives
19th-century American businesspeople